Darantasia xenodora is a moth of the family Erebidae first described by Edward Meyrick in 1886. It is found in New Guinea.

References

Nudariina
Moths described in 1886